The Brown–Maynard House is a historic house in Lowell, Massachusetts.

Description and history 
It is a two-story wood-frame structure, with a low-pitch hip roof topped by a cupola, clapboard siding, and a porch that wraps around the front and side of the house. The cupola is distinguished by tripled narrow round-arch windows on each side, and a bracketed roofline matching that of the main roof. The building's corners have paneled pilasters, and the windows are topped by decorative woodwork. The house was built c. 1852, probably for Samuel Brown, a supervisor at the Boott Mills, and is a fine local example of Italianate architecture.

The house was listed on the National Register of Historic Places on July 2, 1986.

See also
National Register of Historic Places listings in Lowell, Massachusetts

References

Houses on the National Register of Historic Places in Middlesex County, Massachusetts
Houses in Lowell, Massachusetts
National Register of Historic Places in Lowell, Massachusetts
Italianate architecture in Massachusetts
Houses completed in 1852